"Woman in Love" is a song performed by Barbra Streisand and taken from her 1980 album, Guilty. The song was written by Barry and Robin Gibb of the Bee Gees, who received the 1980 Ivor Novello award for Best Song Musically and Lyrically.  It is her fourth of four Platinum records, and is considered her greatest international hit.

After the success enjoyed by the Bee Gees in the late 1970s, the band was asked to participate in musical endeavors for other artists, and Streisand asked Barry Gibb to write an album for her. This album ultimately became Guilty. "Woman in Love", as the lead single, became one of the most successful songs of Streisand's music career. It reached the number-one position on the Billboard Hot 100 chart, Streisand's fifth (and last to date) number one hit on that chart. It replaced Queen's big-selling hit "Another One Bites the Dust", spent three weeks at number one, and was itself replaced by "Lady" by country singer Kenny Rogers. It also spent five weeks atop the adult contemporary chart, her sixth number one on that tally. The song also proved very popular internationally, reaching number one in many countries, including in the UK Singles Chart. The song sold more than 2.5 million till December 1981, according to Billboard.

Music video
The music video for the song included clips from A Star Is Born, starring Streisand and Kris Kristofferson and other movies she made in the 1970s.

Track listing

Personnel
Barbra Streisand – lead vocals
Barry Gibb – acoustic guitar, arrangement 
Pete Carr – lead guitar
Richard Tee – keyboards, electric piano
Harold Cowart – bass guitar
Steve Gadd – drums
Joe Lala – shaker
 Denise Maynelli – background vocals
 Myrna Mathews - background vocals
 Marti McCal – background vocals
 Jerry Peel – French horn

Charts

Weekly charts

Year-end charts

All-time charts

Certifications and sales

Liz McClarnon version

Atomic Kitten member Liz McClarnon covered "Woman in Love" after the band's split in 2005. Produced by original songwriter Robin Gibb—whom McClarnon accompanied on his 2005 tour—the cover was released in February 2006 as McClarnon's debut solo single. In the United Kingdom, the song was released as a double A-side with a cover of Jackie Wilson's 1968 hit "I Get the Sweetest Feeling". The double A-side peaked at number five on the UK Singles Chart on February 19, 2006, staying in the top 100 for six weeks. Elsewhere, "Woman in Love" reached number 21 in Ireland and became a minor hit in Australia, Belgium, and the Netherlands.

McClarnon would go on to record another song entitled "Lately", but the track was not released as a single.

Track listings
UK CD single
 "Woman in Love"
 "I Get the Sweetest Feeling"

Scandinavian CD single
 "Woman in Love" (radio edit)
 "Woman in Love" (Dancing DJs Remix)
 "Woman in Love" (K-Klub Remix)
 "Woman in Love" (Soul Seekerz Dub)

Australian and New Zealand maxi-single
 "Woman in Love" (radio edit)
 "Woman in Love" (K-Klass Klub Remix)
 "Woman in Love" (Soul Seekerz Dub)
 "Woman in Love" (Dancing DJs Remix)

Charts

Release history

Barry Gibb version

"Woman in Love" is the first demo Barry Gibb recorded for Barbra Streisand's album Guilty. This composition by the Gibb brothers Barry and Robin would become the album's very successful first single. And it was due to this demo that Barry Gibb became the first male artist to sing the song, though it was originally recorded for Streisand alone in order for her to sing the song for her album.

Personnel
Barry Gibb – vocals, guitar
Blue Weaver – keyboard
Albhy Galuten – synthesizer, drum machine

See also

List of best-selling singles in France
List of best-selling singles of the 1980s in the United Kingdom
List of Top 25 singles for 1980 in Australia
List of number-one singles in Australia during the 1980s
List of RPM number-one singles of 1980
List of Dutch Top 40 number-one singles of 1980
List of European number-one hits of 1980
List of number-one hits of 1980 (France)
List of number-one hits of 1980 (Germany)
List of number-one singles of 1980 (Ireland)
List of number-one hits in Norway
List of number-one hits (Sweden)
List of number-one hits of 1980 (Switzerland)
List of number-one singles from the 1980s (UK)
List of Hot 100 number-one singles of 1980 (U.S.)
List of number-one adult contemporary singles of 1980 (U.S.)

References

External links
 Official site
 

1980s ballads
1980 singles
1980 songs
2006 debut singles
All Around the World Productions singles
Barbra Streisand songs
Barry Gibb songs
Billboard Hot 100 number-one singles
Bonnier Music singles
Cashbox number-one singles
Columbia Records singles
Dutch Top 40 number-one singles
European Hot 100 Singles number-one singles
Irish Singles Chart number-one singles
Liz McClarnon songs
Number-one singles in Australia
Number-one singles in Austria
Number-one singles in Germany
Number-one singles in Italy
Number-one singles in Norway
Number-one singles in Sweden
Number-one singles in Switzerland
Number-one singles in South Africa
Rock ballads
RPM Top Singles number-one singles
Song recordings produced by Albhy Galuten
Song recordings produced by Barry Gibb
Song recordings produced by Graham Stack (record producer)
Song recordings produced by Robin Gibb
Songs written by Barry Gibb
Songs written by Maurice Gibb
Songs written by Robin Gibb
UK Singles Chart number-one singles